Emil Andreev (Bulgarian: Емил Андреев) (born 1 September 1956, Lom, Bulgaria) is a Bulgarian author, playwright, and novelist.

Biography
Emil Andreev graduated in English Language Studies from the Veliko Tarnovo University. He has worked as a teacher, newspaper editor and lecturer in English at Sofia University "St. Kliment Ohridski".

Andreev has won several awards for his writing, including the Vick and Helikon prizes for fiction. He is an author of the plays "Treasure-hunters", "The Baby" and the comedy "To kill a prime minister" which were played on the scene of the Theatre of Satire, Sofia. His works have been translated into English, German, Polish, Romanian, Slovak and Serbian.

His novel The Glass River has been filmed with an international cast and is already on screen in Bulgaria.

Awards and nominations	

 2007 – Nominated for Elias Canetti Award for The Curse of the Frog
 2007 – Nominated for the Balkanika Award for The Glass River
 2007 – Winner of the Helikon National Award for The Curse of The Frog
 2006 – Nomination for the Best East European Novel for The Glass River
 2005 – Winner of the VICK Award “Novel of the Year” for The Glass River
 2005 – Winner of the Readers’ Award for The Glass River

Books

Short Stories:
Lom Stories (1996)
Late Art Nouveau (1998)
The Drunkard’s Island (1999)

Plays
To Kill a Prime Minister (2002)
The Treasure Hunters (2003)
J's Magical Boat (2005)

Novels
The Glass River (2004)
The Curse of the Frog (2006)
Crazy Luka (2010)

References

External links
 Emil Andreev's Profile on the Contemporary Bulgarian Writers Website
 Emil Andreev at LiterNet
 The Glass River English edition
 Interview in Standart newspaper
 Vick Prize for the Bulgarian Novel of the Year
 Notable Lom people in the Lom municipality website
 The Glass River movie

1956 births
Living people
People from Lom, Bulgaria
Bulgarian dramatists and playwrights
Male dramatists and playwrights
Bulgarian novelists
Male novelists
Bulgarian male writers